The 12019 / 20 Howrah–Ranchi Junction Shatabdi Express is a Superfast Express train of the Shatabdi Express category belonging to Indian Railways – Eastern Railway zone that runs between  and  in India.

It operates as train number 12019 from Howrah Junction to Ranchi Junction and as train number 12020 in the reverse direction, serving the states of West Bengal and Jharkhand.

It was revamped to upgrade to "Swarn (Gold)" standard under Indian Railways' ‘Swarn’ project   and CCTVs, improved toilets are some of the features of the revamped coaches.

This train is likely to be replaced by Howrah - Ranchi Vande Bharat Express but it is yet to be final and the Vande Bharat Express will have same maximum permissible speed as Howrah - Ranchi Shatabdi Express immediately after replacement  which is 130 kmph in one part and less in rest part  but Howrah - Ranchi Vande Bharat Express will have better acceleration and deceleration to cut journey time .

Coaches

The 12019 / 20 Howrah–Ranchi Junction Shatabdi Express presently has two Executive Class, seven AC Chair Car and two End-on Generator coaches. It does not carry a pantry car but being a Shatabdi category train, catering is arranged on board the train;.

As is customary with most train services in India, coach composition may be amended at the discretion of Indian Railways depending on demand.

Service, Routing

The 12019 Howrah–Ranchi Junction Shatabdi Express covers the distance in 07 hours 10 mins (different in opposite direction) averaging  and in 07 hours 45 mins, 12020 Ranchi–Howrah Shatabdi Express averaging  covers 420.800 kilometres (Opposite direction 425.724 km, time is different, as per Ranchi Division Map on South Eastern Railway website, the difference of distance between two directions is in Kita to Gangaghat hill area between Muri and Ranchi). The distance of some stations from Howrah via its route are:  157.725 Km (Being via Howrah Bardhaman Chord - HBC, 12.325 Km less than via Howrah Bardhaman Main as it is the average of according to Howrah Division Map on Eastern Railway Website, Howrah – Bardhaman is 12.33 km less and as per both Howrah Division Map and Asansol Division Map, both on Eastern Railway Website, Howrah - Shaktigarh is 12.32 km less),  181.605 km (Being via Howrah Bardhaman Chord - HBC, 12.325 Km less than via Howrah Bardhaman Main as it is the average of according to Howrah Division Map on Eastern Railway Website, Howrah – Bardhaman is 12.33 km less and as per both Howrah Division Map and Asansol Division Map, both on Eastern Railway Website, Howrah - Shaktigarh is 12.32 km less),  199.795 Km (Being via Howrah Bardhaman Chord - HBC, 12.325 Km less than via Howrah Bardhaman Main as it is the average of according to Howrah Division Map on Eastern Railway Website, Howrah – Bardhaman is 12.33 km less and as per both Howrah Division Map and Asansol Division Map, both on Eastern Railway Website, Howrah - Shaktigarh is 12.32 km less),  258.555 Km (Being via Howrah Bardhaman Chord - HBC, 12.325 Km less than via Howrah Bardhaman Main as it is the average of according to Howrah Division Map on Eastern Railway Website, Howrah – Bardhaman is 12.33 km less and as per both Howrah Division Map and Asansol Division Map, both on Eastern Railway Website, Howrah - Shaktigarh is 12.32 km less),  292.675 Km (view Dhanbad Division Map on East Central Railway Website for Dhanbad - Jamuniatand - Chandrapura distance is 34.12 km),  308.270 Km (view Dhanbad Division Map on East Central Railway Website for Chandrapura to E.C. Railway Zone and S.E. Railway Zone junction after Rajabera distance is 4.8 km and view Adra Division Map on South Eastern Railway Website for that junction to Bokaro steel City distance is 10.615 km),  360.675 Km (don't be confused via other route on the map, view Adra Division Map and Muri Division Map both on South Eastern Railway Website for Bokaro Steel City to Muri distance is 52.425 km as distance from GMH is 52.425 km more to the first place than second as per the maps). View Ranchi Division Map on South Eastern Railway Website for Muri to Ranchi distance, it is different in two directions: 65.029 km towards Ranchi but 60.105 km towards Muri.   

When the Dhanbad-Chandrapura Section was closed in 2017 because of the problem of landslides due to coal mining, the train was diverted to Netaji Subhas Chandra Bose Junction Gomoh (Dhanbad to NSC Bose Jn Gomoh is 29 Km and NSC Bose Jn Gomoh to Chandrapura is 16 Km) and then the train reverses its direction of travel here and continue its journey to Ranchi via Chandrapura. In 6th February 2019, the Dhanbad-Chandrapura section restarted and the train continued to its previous route after few days.   

Like most of the Shatabdi class trains, it returns to its originating station Howrah Junction at the end of the day.

Schedule 
The schedule of this 12019/12020 Howrah - Ranchi Shatabdi Express is given below:-

Speed 
This train likely to be replaced by Howrah - Ranchi Vande Bharat Express that will have same maximum permissible speed as Howrah - Ranchi Shatabdi Express immediately after replacement which is 130 kmph in one part and less in rest part  but Howrah - Ranchi Vande Bharat Express will have better acceleration and deceleration to cut journey time . Howrah - Ranchi Vande Bharat Express will not be able to touch its 160 kmph maximum speed initially in this route.

All coaches of Howrah Ranchi-Shatabdi Express are of air conditioned LHB coach type which is capable of reaching 160 kmph but it does not touch. Sometimes people become confused because according to Indian Railways Permanent Way Manual (IRPWM) on Indian Railways website or Indian Railway Institute of Civil Engineering website, the BG (Broad Gauge) lines have been classified into six groups ‘A’ to ‘E’ on the basis of the future maximum permissible speeds but it may not be same as present speed.

The maximum permissible speed of the train is 130 km/h in Howrah Junction (HWH) – Pradhan Khunta (PKA) –  258.56 km (though distance as per Dhanbad Division Map on East Central Railway Website is 12.32 km higher being via Bardhaman Main Line but as per Howrah Division Map on Eastern Railway Website this train's route via HBC is 12.32 Km shorter than via Main. See Asansol Division Map on Eastern Railway Website to view the distance between end of Howrah Division and beginning of Dhanbad Division) long route which is a part of Howrah–New Delhi route and after leaving common part with Howrah–New Delhi route, maximum permissible speed is lower in the rest part as the rest part is not fit for 130 km/h speed and the maximum permissible speed of this train equals to maximum sectional speed. After Dhanbad, the train runs at a low maximum permissible speed through Dhanbad–Chandrapura line of coal-bearing areas. According to East Central Railway System Map (25 May 2021)  about 31.775 km Dhanbad (DHN) – Jamuniatand (JNN) –  Chandrapura (CRP) (D/L) of 34.12 km (34.12 km distance as per Dhanbad Division Map on East Central Railway website) long Dhanbad (DHN) – Jamuniatand (JNN) –  Chandrapura (CRP) and about 4.782 km-long Chandrapura (CRP) to 0.782 Km after Rajabera (RJB) (that is 4.782 from Chandrapura - CRP) routes  have Group E track. So, speed is not more than 100 km/h in these two routes but actual speed can't be told because, the BG lines have been classified into six groups ‘A’ to ‘E’ on the basis of the future maximum permissible speeds and Group ’E’ lines have speed up to 100 km/h (presently, earlier below). The speed is unknown in next 0.198 Km which is 0.782 km after Rajabera to a junction of E. C. Railway Zone and S. E. Railway Zone. According to a Facebook post of South Eastern Railway on 20 March 2018, the raising of speed in some important sections are Kotshila–Rajabera is 110 km/h (may be the mentioned railway junction after Rajabera towards Ranchi that is before Rajabera towards Howrah but not exactly Rajabera), Muri to Kotshila is 110 km/h – there is another source in support of 110 km/h sectional speed of Kotshila–Bokaro–Rajabera (may be the mentioned railway junction after Rajabera towards Ranchi that is before Rajabera towards Howrah but not exactly Rajabera) section but not of Muri to Kotshila section. As per Adra Division Map and Ranchi Division Map taking together and both on South Eastern Railway Website distance between that rail zones junction after Rajabera to Muri is 63.04 Km. As per Ranchi Division Map on South Eastern Railway Map on their Website the distance between Muri to Ranchi 65.029 km but 60.105 Km on opposite direction Maximum permissible sectional speed is 105 km/h between Muri and Ranchi having Kita to Gangaghat hill area (Ranchi is on the Hatia – Muri section having 105 km/h sectional speed)  but as per another source, maximum permissible speed of Muri Ranchi route is 80 kmph which may be in hilly part only and not in rest parts of Muri - Ranchi route.

Loco link

As the route is fully electrified, a Howrah-based WAP-5 / WAP-7 powers the train for its entire journey.

Achievements

Howrah–Ranchi Shatabdi Express was the second cleanest train in the year of 2018 preceded by Pune–Secunderabad Shatabdi Express among 77 premium trains that were surveyed in the year of 2018 by railways.

References

External links

 https://news.webindia123.com/news/articles/India/20131206/2297991.html
 http://indianrailways.gov.in/railwayboard/uploads/directorate/finance_budget/Previous%20Budget%20Speeches/1995-96.pdf
 https://www.irfca.org/docs/ministers-trains.html

Shatabdi Express trains
Rail transport in West Bengal
Rail transport in Jharkhand
Trains from Howrah Junction railway station
Rail transport in Howrah
Transport in Ranchi